The 1878 season was the second in which Geelong competed in the Victorian Football Association. Geelong finished the season as premiers despite only playing four matches against other senior opponents. Geelong finished the season by winning a play-off against the best metropolitan club, . The result was five goals to one, winning the premiership.

Season Summary

Results

Table

References 

 Geelong Football Club seasons
 1878 in Australian rules football